Shirley S. Kastor (1895–1936) was an American Republican politician from Uinta County, Wyoming. He represented the Uinta district in the Wyoming House of Representatives from 1927 to 1929.

References

Members of the Wyoming House of Representatives
People from Uinta County, Wyoming
1895 births
1936 deaths